The PACE Award is an annual award from Automotive News. The focus of the award is an innovation (i) developed primarily by a supplier, (ii) that is new to the automotive industry, (iii) that is in use (e.g., used on a vehicle in production), and (iv) that "changes the rules of the game." Awards have been given for products, materials, processes, capital equipment, software and services. A panel of independent judges from industry, finance, research, and academia choose finalists from the initial applicants, make site visits to evaluate the innovation, and then gather to select winners, independent of the sponsors. Winners to date include suppliers from Japan, Korea, China, the US, Canada, Brazil, Germany, France, Italy, Poland and other European countries. Among the most awarded companies over the years are BorgWarner, Delphi Automotive, Federal-Mogul (acquired in 2018 by Tenneco), Valeo and PPG Industries as well as Robert Bosch GmbH, Gentex Corporation, and Siemens.

Automotive News and Ernst & Young founded the program, which gave out the first awards in 1995 to celebrate innovation, technological advancement and business performance among automotive suppliers. The black-tie awards ceremony has been held just prior to the annual SAE (Society of Automotive Engineers) convention in Detroit. The costs of the program (administration, judges out-of-pocket expenses, and the award ceremony) are paid by a combination of application fees and money from sponsors. For the 2019-20 the sponsors were Deloitte, APMA (the Ontario, Canada Automotive Modernization Program) and Invest Canada. Historically the annual award cycle began with gathering applications (through the end of summer, with online submissions); the selection of 30-35 finalists, who were announced at the auto industry's annual Global Leadership Conference in October at the Greenbrier; site visits by judges in November and December; the selection of winners in late January or early February; and the announcement of winners at a black tie event in Detroit in March or April. 

For the 2019-2020 award cycle PACE added recognition as a PACE Pilot, which targeted pre-commercial innovations, to try to capture the rise of innovations tied to safety, fuel efficiency, vehicle electrification and driving assist/driving automation. This award attempts to capture innovations earlier in the development cycle, e.g. when they show up in announcements at the Consumer Electronics Show.

Due to the coronavirus pandemic, 2020 awards were made online. No decisions have been made on how the Awards process will adapt in 2020-21 in the face of the pandemic.

Awards programs such as PACE are potential sources for studying the nature of technological change. One such attempt is in Smitka and Warrian (2017). In Chapter6, "Automotive Innovation Model and the Supply Chain: PACE Awards", they find that:
"The results indicate that technology-pull is dominant, not technology-push. We do observe some innovation that seems to represent using new materials to implement a well-understood approach that was not previously cost-effective or otherwise was not used. We also find the occasional bright idea that in some cases could have been implemented decades ago, had anyone thought to try. However, overall we find that new vehicle technologies are responses to regulatory pressure to improve safety, limit emissions, and improve fuel efficiency."
Similarly, David Andrea notes in Forbes that:
"While the popular press is having an interesting debate on whether Detroit or Silicon Valley will have the greatest influence over the mobility revolution, the 2019 PACE awards are dominated by the suppliers with the deepest R&D capabilities and longest histories of commercializing innovation. Reviewing the finalists, it is interesting that the vast majority, 26 of the 31 come from what would be considered "traditional suppliers." And only 6 of the firms are located outside 100 miles of industry's Detroit epicenter. Perhaps this is the result of selection bias as the process to submit applications, meet with judges, produce promotional materials and the like is not small in budget of executive time and funds, two resources always in short supply in smaller firms or start-ups."

Winners
From 1997, citations describing the winning innovations are available on the Automotive News PACE Award web site. Winners for years not listed below, as well as citations that provide a one-paragraph overview of the innovation, can be found on the PACE Awards web site.

1995
 AP Technoglass Company
 Dana
 Gentex Corporation
 Johnson Controls
 Philips Service Industries

1996
 Cherry GmbH
 Delco Electronics
 Fayette Tubular Products
 Gage Products Company
 Progressive Tool and Industries Company (PICO)

1997
 Robert Bosch GmbH
 Dana - Auto Mate 2
 Gentex Corporation - Gentex Metal Reflector
 Johnson Controls - HomeLink
 Rapid Design Services

1998
 Benteler International - Thermally Efficient, Air-Gap Manifold and Exhaust Tube Applications, Parts and Systems
 Cooper Automotive/Wagner Lighting - Chrysler Dakota and Durango Front Lamp Assembly and Related Manufacturing and Assembly Process
 Dürr AG - Radiant Floor Construction (RFC) Paint Oven
 Eaton Corporation - Eaton Spicer Solo
 Gentex Corporation - Aspheric Auto-Dimming Exterior Mirror 
 Johnson Controls - CorteX

1999
 ASHA Corporation - GERODISC (limited slip, hydro-mechanical coupling device)
 Benteler International - WIN88 Rear Twist Beam Axle
 Delphi Corporation - Stabilitrak
 Goodyear - run-flat tires
 Meritor - RHP Highway Parallelogram Trailer Air Suspension System
 Motorola - 32-bit engine management controller
 Stackpole Limited - high load-bearing Powdered Metal Parts
 Teleflex Automotive Group - Adjustable Pedal System

2000
 Autoliv - ASH-2 inflationary device
 Delphi Delco Electronics Systems - Adaptive Cruise Control
 Gentex Corporation - Binary, Complementary Synthetic-White LED Illuminators
 The Gleason Works - Power Dry Cutting/UMC Ultima Axle Gear Manufacturing
 Lumileds - SnapLED
 PPG Industries - Powder Clearcoat Paint
 Rieter - Ultra Light acoustic vehicle treatment
 Siemens - keyless entry system

2001
Product Innovation:
 Hendrickson International - Integrated Front Air Suspension and Steer Axle System
 PPG Industries - Acoustic Coating
 Raytheon - Night Vision
 Tenneco - ASD (Acceleration Sensitive Damping)

Information Technology/Internet:
 Delphi Automotive - Math Based Metal Removal (MBMR) software
 Quality Measurement Control - CM4D Analyze software system

Management Practice:
 ZF Friedrichshafen - Ergonomically based job assignment employee rotation process in its Tuscaloosa, Alabama plant

Manufacturing Process:
 Nucap Industries - NUCAP Retention System

Europe:
 Robert Bosch GmbH - High Pressure Common Rail

Open Category - Enduring Innovations:
 Shape Corporation - Tubular High Strength Swept Bumpers

Open Category - Environmental:
 BASF - Integrated Process

2002
Product Innovation:
 Delphi Automotive - Quadrasteer
 Delphi Deco Electronics Systems - Passive Occupant Detection System, Generation II (PODS II)
 Goodyear - Wrangler maximum traction/reinforced, off-road tire (MT/R)
 PPG Industries - Transportation Coating - FrameCoat Electrocoating
 The POM Group - Direct Metal Deposition process

Europe:
 Robert Bosch GmbH - Aerotwin windshield wipers
 ZF Getriebe GmbH

Information Technology:
 Engineous Software - iSight software for process integration and design optimization

2003
Product Innovation:
 3M - Solar Reflecting Film
 Delphi Automotive - MagneRide variable suspension damping
 Federal-Mogul Corporation - Wagner ThermoQuiet Brake Pads and Shoes
 Material Sciences Corporation - Acoustically engineered steel laminate Quiet Steel
 PPG Industries - Ceramic clearcoat paint

Product Europe:
 Siemens VDO Automotive - Piezo Common Rail Diesel Direct Injection System

Manufacturing Process & Capital Equipment:
 Bishop Steering Technology - Warm Forging Die and Integrated Automatic Precision Forging Cell
 Dürr AG - RoDip 3 electro-coating
 The POM Group - RapiDIES foam forming process
 Robert Bosch GmbH - Cassette Chrome Plating Process

Information Technology & Services:
 Perceptron Inc. - AutoGauge FMS In-Process Measuring System

2004
Product Innovation:
 Delphi Delco Electronics Systems - Delphi Forewarn Back-up Aid and Side Alert
 Denso - Very High Pressure Solenoid Fuel Injection System
 Johnson Controls - Overhead Rail Vehicle Personalization System
 Visteon - Long Life Filtration Systems

Product Europe:
 TRW Automotive - Active Control seatbelt retractor

Process:
 BASF - ColorCARE software for controlling and comparing paint color
 DuPont - Wet on Wet Two Tone Products
 Filter Specialists - FERRX 5000 magnetic separation device to remove ferrous particles of the initial, e-coat, prior to the application of base coat paint

Information Technology:
 AutoForm Engineering - DieDesigner Stamping FEA Simulation Geometry Generation
 Delphi Automotive - horizontal modeling and digital process design for CAD/CAM
 Motorola - VIAMOTO navigation system

2005
Product:
 Dura Automotive Systems - Racklift Window Lift System
 Gentex Corporation - SmartBeam Headlamp Dimming Microelectronics Solution
 Illinois Tool Works - Direct Fuel System (DFS)
 Multimatic - I-Beam Control Arm
 Tenneco - Kinetic RFS (Reverse Function Stabilizer) technology
 Valeo - Lane Departure Warning System

Product Europe:
 Advanced Automotive Antennas - Fractal Antennas
 BorgWarner - DualTronic dual clutch transmission - more commonly known as Volkswagen Group's Direct-Shift Gearbox (DSG)
 Siemens VDO Automotive - Information Systems Passenger Cars reconfigurable color head-up display

Manufacturing Process & Capital Equipment:
 Siemens VDO Automotive - DEKA VII Low Pressure Electronic Gasoline Fuel Injectors

Information Technology & Services:
 i2 Technologies - Optimal Scheduler software for auto assembly plants

Innovative OEM Collaborator Awards:
 Chrysler with Dura Automotive Systems - Improved Window-Lift Systems
 Mercedes-Benz with Sick AG - Entry/Exit Light Curtain

2006
Product:
 Federal-Mogul Corporation - Monosteel Diesel Piston
 Illinois Tool Works - BosScrew Fastener
 Magneti Marelli - Software Flexfuel Sensor (SFS) for Flexible-fuel vehicles
 Osram Opto Semiconductors - Color on Demand interior lighting
 SKF - X-Tracker Asymmetric Hub Bearing Unit

Product Europe:
 Preh Automotive - Windshield Defogging Sensor
 Tenneco - Low Cost, Low Weight Muffler
 Valeo - StARS Micro-Hybrd system

Manufacturing Process & Capital Equipment:
 Dow Automotive - Betamate LESA Adhesive System
 PosiCharge - Battery Charging System

Information Technology:
 CogniTens - OptiCell Non-Contact Measuring System for quality control inspection

Innovative OEM Collaborator Awards:
 General Motors with PPG Industries - Color Harmony Process
 Ford with PosiCharge - Fast Charging Battery Technology

2007
Product:
 Alcoa - Dura-Bright Wheels with XBR Technology
 Autoliv - Safety Vent Airbag
 Federal-Mogul Corporation - HTA (High Temperature Alloy) Exhaust Gaskets
 Halla Climate Control Corp - Wave Blade Fan and Saw Tooth Shroud
 Valeo - Multi-Beam Radar (MBR) Blind-Zone Radar Sensor

Product Europe:
 BorgWarner Turbo & Emissions Systems - BorgWarner Turbo & Emissions Systems Gasoline Turbocharger with Variable Turbine Geometry
 Federal-Mogul Corporation Goetze Diamond Coating (GDC) (Piston Ring Coating)

Manufacturing Process & Capital Equipment:
 Behr GmbH & Co. KG - BehrOxal surface treatment for corrosion protection
 DuPont - DuPont EcoConcept paint and process
 Hirotec - E3 Hemming Press

Information Technology:
 RTT USA - RTT DeltaGen visualization toolset
 Tenneco - Diesel Aftertreatment Predictive Development Process

Innovative OEM Collaborator Awards:
 Porsche with BorgWarner Turbo & Emissions Systems - BorgWarner Turbo & Emissions Systems Gasoline Turbocharger with Variable Turbine Geometry
 Porsche with BorgWarner TorqTransfer Systems - BorgWarner High Energy ITM3e AWD System
 Volkswagen with DuPont - DuPont EcoConcept paint and process

2008
Product:
 Cummins - Cummins 6.7-liter Turbo diesel
 Dow Automotive - IMPAXX Energy Absorbing Foam
 Eaton Corporation - CRUTONITE Valve Alloy
 Gentex Corporation - Rear Camera Display (RCD) Mirror
 Magneti Marelli - Tetrafuel System for use with Gasoline, Ethanol or Compressed Natural Gas
 Xanavi Informatics Corporation and Sony Corporation - Around View Monitor (AVM)

Product Europe:
 BorgWarner Turbo & Emissions Systems - Turbocharger with R2S Regulated Two-Stage Technology
 Continental AG - Direct Injection System for Gasoline Applications
 Valeo - Park 4U Semi-Automatic Parallel Parking

Manufacturing Process & Capital Equipment:
 PPG Industries - Green Logic Paint Detackification Process
 Webasto - Panoramic Polycarbonate Roof Module

Information Technology and Services:
 Delphi Automotive - Sirius Backseat TV

Innovation Partnership Awards:
 Chrysler with Mahle GmbH - CamInCam Variable valve timing (VVT) camshaft
 Honda with Takata Corporation - Motorcycle Airbag System
 Nissan with Xanavi Informatics Corporation and Sony Corporation - Around View Monitor (AVM)

2009
Product:
 BorgWarner Morse TEC - Morse TEC CTA Camshaft Phasing System
 Eaton Corporation - Eaton Twin Vortices Supercharger - TVS
 Futuris Automotive - Tufted PET Carpet
 Magna Mirrors - BlindZone Mirror

Product Europe:
 BorgWarner BERU Systems - Pressure Sensor Glow Plug (PSG) for Diesel Engines
 LuK GmbH & Co. - LuK Double Clutch for Double Clutch Transmissions
 TI Automotive - Saddle-Shaped PZEV Plastic Fuel Tank

Manufacturing Process & Capital Equipment:
 Alcoa - Alcoa's Vacuum Die Casting (AVDC) for Lightweight Door Assemblies
 Henkel - Bonderite TecTalis Pre-treatment Process

Information Technology & Services:
 Dassault Systèmes - DELMIA Automation digital manufacturing and production software solution
 Microsoft - Microsoft Auto

Innovation Partnership Awards:
 Ford with BorgWarner Morse TEC
 General Motors with Futuris Automotive

2010
Product:
 Delphi Automotive - Electronically Scanning Radar
 Dura Automotive Systems - Horizontal Sliding Rear Window with Defrost
 Meridian Lightweight Technologies - Single Piece Cast Magnesium Liftgate Inner Panel
 PPG Industries - Super High Power Electrocoat
 TI Automotive - Dual Channel Single Stage (DCSS 39-50) Electric fuel Pump
 WABCO Vehicle Control Systems - OptiDrive Transmission Automation System

Product Europe:
 Continental/NGK Insulators - Smart NOx Sensor
 Delphi Corporation Powertrain Systems Division - Delphi direct Acting Piezo Injector
 Federal-Mogul Corporation - Bayonet Connection System for Profile Wiper Blades
 ZF Getriebe GmbH - ZF 8HP 8 Automatic Transmission

Manufacturing Process & Capital Equipment:
 Henkel - Aquence Autodeposition and Co-Cure Paint Process
 Dürr AG - EcoDryScrubber paint overspray retrieval system
 Federal-Mogul Corporation - DuraBowl Piston Reinforcement Process
 Federal-Mogul Corporation - High Precision Electro-Erosion Machining
 Johnson Controls/Nordenia Deutschland - molded polypropylene (PP) Thin Film

Informatian Technology & Services:
 Siemens PLM Software - Teamcenter In-Vehicle Software (IVS) Management System

Innovation PArtnership Awards:
 Bombardier Recreational Products with Robert Bosch GmbH - Vehicle Stability System (VSS) for a 3-Wheeled Vehicle
 Ford with Clarion Corporation of America - Next Generation Navigation System
 Ford with Dura Automotive Systems - Horizontal Sliding Rear window with Defrost
 Ford with Meridian Lightweight Technologies - Single Piece Cast Magnesium Liftgate Inner Panel

2011
Product:
 Delphi Automotive - Delphi Multec GDi Fuel Injector
 Federal-Mogul Corporation - EcoTough Piston Coating for Gasoline Engines
 Federal-Mogul Corporation - Low-Friction LKZ Oil Control Ring (Innovative Two-piece Oil Ring for Direct-Injection Gasoline Engines)
 Henkel - Terophon High Damping Foam
 Honeywell Turbo Technologies - Honeywell DualBoost Turbocharger for Medium Duty Diesel Engines
 Janesville Acoustics - Molded Fiber IP Closeputs with Integrated Lighting and Ducts
 Key Safety Systems - Inflatable Seat Belt System
 Mahle GmbH - Electrical Waste Gate Actuator
 Osram Opto Semiconductors GmbH - LED Headlamp
 Robert Bosch GmbH - Bosch P2 Parallel Full Hybrid Electric Vehicle System
 Schaeffler Technologies - Lightweight Balance Shaft with Roller Bearings

Manufacturing Process:
 Takata Corporation - Vacuum Folding Technology

Innovative Partnership Awards:
 Chrysler with Janesville Acoustics - Molded Fiber IP Closeputs with Integrated Lighting and Ducts
 Ford with Dassault Systèmes - Powertrain Digital Integration and Automation (PDIA)
 Ford with Key Safety Systems - Inflatable Seat Belt System

2012
Product:
 BorgWarner Turbo Systems - Turbocharger for Internal Combustion Engines with Low-Pressure Exhaust Gas Recirculation
 Delphi Automotive - Delphi L-Shape Crimp for 0.13 mm2 wire size
 Hendrickson Auxiliary Axle Systems - Complient Tie rod (CTR) Assembly and Damening System with PerfecTrak Technology
 Honeywell Turbo Technologies - High Temperature, Ball Bearing (HTBB) VNT Turbo
 Lear Corporation - Lear Solid State Smart Junction Box (S3JB)
 Magna Mirrors - Infinity Mirror with touch screen technology
 Methode Electronics Innovative TouchSensor Controls to Ford's MyFord Touch User Interface System
 Schaeffler Technologies - UniAir Fully Variable Valve Lift System
 Valeo - VisioBlade System (high-efficiency adaptive windshield washer system)

Manufacturing Process:
 Delphi Automotive - Delphi Thermal Multi Port Folded Tube Condenser
 Federal-Mogul Corporation - Two-Dimensional Ultrasonic Testing for Raised Gallery Diesel Pistons (Manufacturing Process)
 Nalco Company - APEX Program-Sustainable Technology for Paint Detackification
 PPG Industries - B1 and B2 Compact Process Paint Technology
 3M/Esys Automation - Robotic Production System with Wheel Weights for Precision Tire and Wheel Balancing

Innovation Partnership Awards:
 Fiat Powertrain and Chrysler with Schaeffler Technologies - UniAir Fully Variable Valve Lift System
 Ford with Dana - Active Warm-up Heat Exchanger with Integrated Thermal Bypass Valve

2013
Product
 BorgWarner Turbo Systems - Regulated 3--turbocharger System (R3S)
 Brose North America - Hands-free Liftgate Opener
 Continental Interior Division, Body and Security - Tire Pressure Monitoring System (LocSync)
 Continental Chassis & Safety Division, ADAS Business Unit - 24GHZ ISM Band Short Range Radar
 Dana - Diamond Series Driveshafts
 Delphi Automotive - F2E Distributed Pump Common Rail System
 Federal-Mogul - Coating for Engine Bearings
 GPM GmbH - Electro-Hydraulic Controlled Flow (ECF) Water Pump
 Halla Visteon Climate Control Corporation - Metal Seal Fitting
 PPG Industries - Andaro Tint Dispersion
 Valeo - Air Intake Module with integrated Water Charge Air Cooler

Manufacturing Process and Capital Equipment
 Federal-Mogul - Injection Molding of High Modulus Bonded Pistons used in High Pressure Transmissions
 Schuler Hydroforming Division - Hydroforming and Global Die Standardization Process

Information Technology
 Hughes Telematics - Automotive Software Remote Update Technology

Innovation Partnership Winners
 BMW with BorgWarner Turbo Systems - Regulated 3-turbocharger System (R3S)
 General Motors with Takata Corporation - Front Center Airbag
 Mercedes-Benz with Hughes Telematics - Automotive Software Remote Update Technology
 Toyota with Continental Chassis & Safety Division, ADAS Business Unit - 24GHZ ISM Band Short Range Radar
 Volkswagen with Valeo - Air Intake Module

2014
Product
 Autoliv Inc. - Vårgårda Sweden - "Green" Airbag Inflator
 BASF Corp. - Wyandotte. Mich. - Mold in Color High Touch, High Gloss Black Interior Door Switch Bezels
 BorgWarner Transmission Systems - Auburn Hills, Mich. - BorgWarner Stop/Start Accumulator Solenoid Valve (Eco-Launch™ Solenoid Valve)
 Continental Automotive - Chassis and Safety Business Unit - Auburn Hills, Mich. - Pressure Sensor for Pedestrian Protection (PPS pSAT)
 Delphi Automotive - Warren, Ohio - ErgoMate™ Mechanical Assist System
 Dow Automotive Systems - Auburn Hills, Mich. - BETAMATE™ Epoxy Structural Adhesive for Durable Bonding of Untreated Aluminum
 Federal-Mogul – Wiesbaden, Germany - High Performance Bearings Without Lead
 HELLA KGaA Hueck & Co. - Lippstadt, Germany - LED Matrix Beam Head Lights
 Robert Bosch LLC - Farmington Hills, Mich. - Spray Enhancements in Gasoline Direct Injection Enabled by Laser Drilling
 Schaeffler Group - Wooster, Ohio - Torque Converter with Centrifugal Pendulum Absorber
 Valeo - Driving Assistance Product Group - Bietigheim-Bissingen, Germany - Back-over Protection System
 ZF Friedrichshafen - Saarbrucken, Germany - Car Powertrain Technology Division - ZF's 9-speed Automatic Transmission

Manufacturing Process and Capital Equipment

 ArcelorMittal and Magna-Cosma International - Chicago - Laser Ablation Process
 Henkel Corporation - Madison Heights, Mich. - BONDERITE® 2798™ Process for High Aluminum
 TI Automotive - Auburn Hills, Mich. - Adaptable Plastic Fuel Tank Advanced Process Technology (TAPT) for all vehicle powertrains

Innovation Partnership Winners

 Ford for partnership on the high-gloss black interior door switch bezels with BASF Corporation
 General Motors for partnership on the Eco-Launch™ solenoid valve with BorgWarner Transmission Systems
 Honda R&D Americasfor partnership on the laser ablation process with ArcelorMittal and Magna-Cosma International
 Paccar for partnership on the BETAMATE™ structural adhesive for untreated aluminum with Dow Automotive Systems
 Tesla Motors for partnership on the Tegra® Visual Computing Module (VCM) with NVIDIA Corporation
 Volvo Car Corporation for partnership on the pedestrian protection airbag with Autoliv Inc.

2015
 BorgWarner - Limited-slip differential for front-wheel drive >> Detailed citation
 ContinentalAG - Printed circuit board for transmission control units  >> Detailed citation
 Continental Automotive Systems Inc. - Multiapplication unified sensor element >> Detailed citation
 Denso- Standardized HVAC unit >> Detailed citation
 Federal-Mogul- DuroGlide piston ring coating >> Detailed citation
 Federal-Mogul - MicroTorq seal for rotating shafts >> Detailed citation
 FTE automotive - 2Polymer hydraulic gear shift actuator >> Detailed citation
 GKN Driveline - Two-speed gearbox for electrified vehicles >> Detailed citation
 Magna Closures - PureView seamless sliding window >> Detailed citation
 Mahle - Evotec 2 lightweight piston >> Detailed citation
 Nvidia - Tegra visual computing module >> Detailed citation
 Osram Opto Semiconductors - Oslon black flat multichip family >> Detailed citation
 Sika Automotive - Adhesive for mixed material bonding >> Detailed citation
 Valeo Electrical Systems - Efficient alternator >> Detailed citation

2020
 American Axle & Manufacturing, Detroit - Electric driveline
 Continental Structural Plastics, Auburn Hills, Mich. Subsidiary of Teijin- CarbonPro pickup box
 Delphi Technologies, Kokomo, Ind. - DIFlex-integrated circuit
 EJOT Fastening Systems, Wixom, Mich. - EJOWELD friction element welding
 Gentex Corp., Zeeland, Mich. - Integrated toll module
 Lear Corp., Southfield, Mich. - Xevo commerce and service platform
 Magna Exteriors, Troy, Mich. - Composite space frame
 Marelli, Auburn Hills, Mich. - h-Digi lighting module
 Mobileye REM Division, Jerusalem - Road Experience Management
 Schaeffler Technologies, Herzogenaurach, Germany - Compact coaxial transmission for e-axle
 Stoneridge, Novi, Mich. - MirrorEye camera monitor system
 Tenneco, Southfield, Mich. - IROX2 bearing coating
 Valeo, Bietigheim-Bissingen, Germany - XtraVue trailer

See also

 List of motor vehicle awards
 International Engine of the Year
 Progressive Insurance Automotive X Prize
 RJC Car of the Year
 Ward's 10 Best Engines

References

External links
 PACE Award official site(1)
 PACE Award official site(2)
 PACE Awards at autonews.com
 Descriptions of Innovations of PACE Finalists and Award Winners

Automotive accessories
Motor vehicle awards